Kellogg's Six-Hour Day is a 1996 book by Benjamin Kline Hunnicutt on the implementation and effects of a reduced work week policy at Kellogg's.

References

External links 
 
 

1996 non-fiction books
English-language books
Books by Benjamin Kline Hunnicutt
Temple University Press books